Anambra South Senatorial District in Anambra State, Nigeria is one of the three Senatorial Districts in the State. It has seven local governments areas. These are: Aguata(300PU), Ekwusigo(175PU), Ihiala(278PU), Nnewi North(198PU), Nnewi south(295PU), Orumba North(231PU), Orumba South(192PU) totaling 1,669 polling units.

The district covers 1,320 of the 4,887 km2 area of Anambra state. The incumbent representative of this senatorial district in the Nigerian Senate is Ifeanyi Ubah.

Notable people in Anambra South Senatorial District 

Charles Soludo, Incumbent Governor of Anambra State and Former Governor, Central Bank of Nigeria

Virginia Etiaba, Former Governor and First Nigerian Female State Governor.

Nwafor Orizu, Former President of the Senate of Nigeria

Obiageli Ezekwesili, Economic policy expert

Chukwuemeka Ezeife, Former Governor 

Chinwoke Mbadinuju, Former Governor

Emeka Sibeudu, Former Deputy Governor

Mbazulike Amaechi, Nigerian Elder Statesman and first Minister of Aviation

Ikechukwu Obiorah, Former Senator of the Federal Republic of Nigeria

Emmanuel Nnamdi Uba, Former Senator of the Federal Republic of Nigeria

Oliver De Coque, Nigerian guitarist and one of Africa's most prolific recording artists.

Cletus Ibeto, Nigerian businessman and Head, Ibeto Group

Innocent Chukwuma, founder and CEO of Innoson Vehicle Manufacturing Company.

References 

Senatorial districts in Nigeria
Politics of Anambra State